Euaresta bullans is a species of fruit fly in the genus Euaresta of the family Tephritidae.

Distribution
Peru, Chile, Argentina, Uruguay. Introduced to: California, Arizona, South Europe, Middle East, South Africa, Australia.

References

Tephritinae
Insects described in 1830
Diptera of South America